This is a list of Principals of Hertford College, Oxford, including its two predecessor institutions, Hart Hall and Magdalen Hall.

Principals of Hart Hall (1282–1740)

Principals of Hertford College, first foundation (1740–1816)

Principals of Magdalen Hall, old site (1480–1822)

Principals of Magdalen Hall, new site (1822–1874)

Principals of Hertford College, second foundation (1874–)

References

Sources
 
 

 
 
 
Hertford Principals
Hertford College, Oxford